Ahogrenashinme Kigbu (born 5 February 1999) is an English footballer who plays as a defender.

Career
Growing up, Kigbu trained with both Manchester United and Manchester City but eventually chose to sign for the later after attending St Bede's College. On 31 July 2018, Kigbu joined Austrian Bundesliga side Wolfsberger AC on a two-year deal with the option of a third. Two weeks later, he made his professional debut, playing the last ten minutes in a 0–0 draw with Rapid Wien.

On 8 August 2019, Kigbu signed for Championship side Stoke City joining their under-23 squad. Kigbu was released by Stoke in July 2020.

International career
Born in England, Kigbu is of Nigerian descent. Kigbu was called up to the England under-18 team for the first time in August 2016 for a four-team mini tournament. He went on to make his debut in a 2–1 win over Italy U18.

Career statistics

References

External links

Austrian Football Bundesliga players
English footballers
England youth international footballers
English people of Nigerian descent
1999 births
Living people
Wolfsberger AC players
Association football defenders
Austrian Regionalliga players
Footballers from Manchester
People educated at St Bede's College, Manchester
English expatriate footballers
English expatriate sportspeople in Austria